NCIS: Los Angeles is an American action television series combining elements of the military drama and police procedural genres, which premiered on CBS on September 22, 2009. The series follows the exploits of the Los Angeles–based Office of Special Projects (OSP), an elite division of the Naval Criminal Investigative Service that specializes in undercover assignments. NCIS: Los Angeles is the first spin-off of the successful series NCIS and the second series in the NCIS franchise.

The series originally starred Chris O'Donnell, Daniela Ruah, LL Cool J, Peter Cambor, Adam Jamal Craig, Linda Hunt and Barrett Foa. Cambor was demoted to recurring status, and Craig's character was killed off at the end of season 1, while Foa was written out at the end of season 12 and Hunt was demoted to "special guest star" status at the beginning of season 13. Other stars have included Eric Christian Olsen, Renée Felice Smith, Miguel Ferrer, Nia Long, Medalion Rahimi, Caleb Castille, and Gerald McRaney. The show has received mixed reviews from critics, but has been a solid rating hit for CBS. 

On March 31, 2022, CBS renewed the series for a fourteenth season which premiered on October 9, 2022. On January 20, 2023, it was announced that the series would end after the fourteenth season, with the series finale airing on May 21, 2023.

Premise 
NCIS: Los Angeles follows Special Agents Sam Hanna (LL Cool J) and Grisha Callen (Chris O'Donnell), undercover agents assigned to the Office of Special Projects, a special branch of the Naval Criminal Investigative Service that specializes in undercover assignments. Sam is an ex-US Navy SEAL and former member of SEAL Team Six and dedicated family man. Callen is a former foster child who became a "legend" under the watchful eye of Operations Manager Henrietta "Hetty" Lange (Linda Hunt). At the start of the series, Sam, Callen, and Hetty are supported by Special Agent Kensi Blye (Daniela Ruah), a hand-to-hand combat specialist, trained sniper and forensic whiz, rookie agent Dominic Vail (Adam Jamal Craig), Operational Psychologist Nate Getz (Peter Cambor) and Technical Operator Eric Beale (Barrett Foa). Vail is abducted by terrorists halfway through season 1 and, following a period of being held hostage, is killed during his rescue mission near the end of the season. Getz, meanwhile, enters training to become an agent in the back-half of the season, and is reassigned during season 2, returning for occasional guest appearances afterwards.

In season 2, LAPD Detective Marty Deeks (Eric Christian Olsen), after helping on several cases late in the prior season, joins the OSP team as a liaison between LAPD and NCIS, replacing Vail as Kensi's partner. He holds this position until departmental reforms in season 12 end up terminating it, after which he completes FLETC training and officially joins NCIS as an Investigator. Over the course of the series, Deeks and Kensi slowly evolve from partners to lovers, with the two marrying in season 10. Also joining the team in season 2 is Intelligence Analyst Nell Jones (Renee Felice Smith), a brilliant agent whom Hetty hopes to have take her place eventually, and who forms a close relationship with Beale.

During season 3, Assistant Director Owen Granger (Miguel Ferrer), an old friend of Hetty's, is assigned to the team as oversight with her, and manages to develop a cordial relationship with the team despite a frosty start. In season 8, Granger falls ill with cancer, coinciding with Ferrer's real-life battle with the disease; following Ferrer's death, Granger is written to have fled the hospital while in recovery from a failed assassination attempt, and is later confirmed to have died from his illness during the following season.

In season 9, Executive Assistant Director Pacific (EADPAC) Shay Mosley (Nia Long) is assigned to the OSP after Hetty leaves on a personal mission to free an old colleague in Vietnam; the team later rescues her when the mission goes wrong. Mosley, meanwhile, sends the team on an unsanctioned mission to Mexico to rescue her son from her criminal ex-husband at the end of the season; while successful in its goals, the mission results in the death of Mosley's trusted assistant, the wounding of most of the rest of team, and the OSP being put under the microscope during the beginning of season 10; Mosley later accepts full responsibility, resigns and goes into hiding with her son to escape a cartel allied with her ex (whom she had killed during the mission).

During seasons 11 and 12, rookie agents Fatima Nazami (Medalion Rahimi) and Devin Rountree (Caleb Castille) are recruited to the OSP, while Beale and Jones depart for the private sector at the end of the latter season. With Hetty leaving to do damage control from a prior mission, Admiral Hollace Kilbride (Gerald McRaney), who has assisted the OSP in multiple cases, is assigned in her place as interim Operations Manager in season 13.

Characters

Main 
Current
 Chris O'Donnell as G. Callen, NCIS Special Agent in Charge of the Office of Special Projects.
 Daniela Ruah as Kensi Blye, NCIS Special Agent attached to the Office of Special Projects.
 LL Cool J as Sam Hanna, NCIS Senior Special Agent and ex–Navy SEAL and second in command of the Office of Special Projects.
 Eric Christian Olsen as Marty Deeks (seasons 2–14; recurring season 1), NCIS Investigator and ex-LAPD detective who previously served as liaison officer for NCIS/LAPD
 Medalion Rahimi as Fatima Namazi (seasons 11–14; recurring seasons 10–11), NCIS Special Agent with the Office of Special Projects.
 Caleb Castille as Devin Rountree (seasons 12–14; recurring season 11), NCIS Special Agent and ex-FBI Agent.
 Gerald McRaney as Adm. Hollace Kilbride (Retd) (seasons 13–14; guest seasons 6 and 11; recurring seasons 10 and 12), an ex–US Navy Admiral and friend of Henrietta Lange, who initially counsels the OSP team on their missions. Following Hetty’s departure, Kilbride is appointed Director of Special Operations for NCIS by Director Leon Vance. In this capacity he leads OSP.

Former
 Peter Cambor as Nate Getz (season 1; recurring seasons 2–8, and 13), an Operational Psychologist originally attached to OSP in order to monitor the team's emotional well-being. Valued as both an agent and a doctor, Getz is later drafted to a deep cover operation and subsequently becomes a well-established field agent. Despite his career change, Getz still returns to Los Angeles when needed.
 Adam Jamal Craig as Dominic Vail (season 1), a probationary agent and a technical specialist who was assigned to OSP straight out of training. He is partnered with Kensi and seen as a sort of younger brother to the other team members; NCIS Los Angeles is left devastated when, following a period as a missing person, Dom is killed during his own rescue mission when he saves Sam from an unseen assailant.
 Barrett Foa as Eric Beale (seasons 1–12), the team's Technical Operator and resident geek. He was not an undercover operative like his teammates until season seven, so was not firearms-trained until then. Beale is incredibly comfortable in the OSP much to the chagrin of his teammates who often become annoyed by his quirks such as leaving his surf board by their cars. He is partnered and in a romantic relationship with Nell. In season 12, Beale leaves NCIS to start his own company, which soon makes him a billionaire due to selling several of his programs to the government. At the end of the season, he and Nell move to Tokyo to head a new project for his company.
 Linda Hunt as Henrietta "Hetty" Lange (seasons 1–12; special guest star seasons 13–14), NCIS Supervisory Special Agent and Operations Manager of the Office of Special Projects. She oversees the OSP team while on assignments, providing them with a wide variety of support, ranging from advanced surveillance equipment to transport to foreign nations. Throughout the series, she is revealed to have taken in and "raised" a number of orphaned children, including Callen, grooming them into becoming highly-skilled agents for the U.S. government. From season 9 onwards, she is frequently absent from OSP headquarters, embarking on lengthy and dangerous missions in foreign nations without the knowledge of the team.
 Renée Felice Smith as Nell Jones (seasons 2–12), a Special Agent who acts as the team's intelligence analyst. She is just as comfortable outside the office as in it, and is speculated by many that Hetty is grooming her as a replacement. Jones is a highly capable field operative and extremely skilled firearms expert. She has the highest IQ of anybody at NCIS. She is partnered and involved in a romantic relationship with Eric. She resigns from NCIS late in season 11 after struggling with emotional burnout over professional and personal concerns. Nell returns to OSP in the season 12 premiere following the death of her mother to fill in as Acting Operational Manager for Hetty, who is away on a mission. At the end of the season, after debating over whether to take the position permanently, she instead opts to leave NCIS and move to Tokyo with Eric to head a new project for his company.
 Miguel Ferrer as Owen Granger (seasons 5–8; recurring seasons 3–4), the assistant director of NCIS. He is the team's link to Washington, and while he is often seen at loggerheads with his subordinates, he no doubt has a great desire to keep them safe. Unlike other administrators, he is not afraid to accompany the team into the field. Granger spent many years overseas as a field agent on many hazardous assignments before becoming an administrator. He is a longtime friend and sometimes adversary of Hetty. During season 8, Granger is revealed to be suffering from an unknown ailment, most likely cancer, due to a lifetime of bad habits. In the episode "Payback" (Miguel Ferrer's final episode filmed before his death), after being wounded by rogue CIA operatives, Granger disappears from the hospital. In the following season, Granger's daughter, Jennifer Kim (Malese Jow), confirms his death from his illness.
 Nia Long as Shay Mosley (seasons 9–10), a former Secret Service agent who becomes the NCIS Executive Assistant Director for Pacific Operations (EAD-PAC). She comes off as hardened and cold towards the team, but eventually, they warm up to each other, especially following Hetty's return. She is revealed to have a son named Derrick, who was taken by his father, criminal arms dealer Spencer Williams, when Williams fled the country for Mexico five years prior. At the end of season 9, she enacts an unsanctioned mission for the team to head into Mexico and retrieve Derrick. While the mission is ultimately successful (during which Mosley kills Williams), it comes at a costly price: Mosley's assistant Special Agent Harley Hidoko is killed, the rest of the team is grievously wounded, and the OSP is put under the microscope by D.C. officials. In season 10, after a drug cartel allied with Williams puts bounties on the team's heads, Mosley opts to take full responsibility for everything, resigns her post, and flees with her son into hiding.

Recurring 
 Rocky Carroll as Leon Vance, the director of NCIS (seasons 1–3, 6): He initially spent a great amount of time "getting the new LA office up and running", but still returns to ensure the well-being of his agents. Carroll also appears on both NCIS (as a regular), and NCIS: New Orleans. He makes a seventh appearance in "Hunted". Vance appears in the season two finale and season three premiere. He makes his tenth appearance during season six.
 Brian Avers as Mike Renko, an agent attached to NCIS's Los Angeles satellite office (seasons 1, 3): He often works with OSP. An undercover operative, Renko later reported directly to Owen Granger. The team were fond of him, so it came as a shock when he was gunned down during an operation gone awry in a revenge attack.
 Kathleen Rose Perkins as Rose Schwartz, a Los Angeles County Medical Examiner (seasons 1–4): She often assists the team on their investigations. She is incredibly quirky and develops an affinity for Nate Getz, showing great romantic interest in the psychologist.
 Ronald Auguste as Moe Dusa, a man whom Sam first came into contact with in Sudan (seasons 1–2): A "brother" to Sam, of sorts, he joins a terrorist group and assists in the kidnapping of Dom. Developing a conscience, Moe assists in Dom's escape. He is later found dead by the NCIS agents.
 Vyto Ruginis as Arkady Kolcheck, a retired Russian operative (seasons 1–present): He is friends with Callen. He considers himself to be of great assistance to the NCIS team but often brings trouble in his wake. He has a daughter, Anastasia, whom he does not know very well.
 Claire Forlani as Lauren Hunter, an NCIS Operations Manager and SSA (seasons 2–3): Taken in by Hetty as a teenager, Lauren later becomes an NCIS agent and succeeds Hetty for a short time as Special Agent in Charge of OSP. Initially adversarial, the team later warmed to Hunter. She was reassigned following Lange's return but was later kidnapped and murdered by the Chameleon. Her death has a lasting effect on Lange.
 Indira G. Wilson/Aunjanue Ellis as Michelle Hanna aka "Quinn" (seasons 3–8): Sam Hanna's wife, Michelle, is a former deep-cover CIA operative. At the end of the eighth season, Michelle is kidnapped and murdered by Tahir Khaled in a vendetta against Sam.
 Layla Crawford/Kayla Smith as Kamran Hanna (seasons 3−4, 6, 8 and 12), Sam Hanna's daughter.
 Christopher Lambert as Marcel Janvier, a serial killer and criminal mastermind (season 3–5): When Marcel is conducting business transactions, his modus operandi is to buy the supplies for his employers and then arrange a drop-off for the merchandise. He is the primary antagonist to Callen during the show's third season and is responsible for the deaths of Hunter and Renko.
 Scott Grimes as Dave Flynn, an NCIS Special Agent (seasons 4, 8): Initially an NCIS forensic specialist assigned to the elite rapid response NCIS: Red team stationed out of San Diego, Dave later transfers to San Diego's NCIS: Cyber, where he retrains as a senior intelligence analyst.
 Erik Palladino as Vostanik Sabatino, a CIA Agent (seasons 4–5, 7–8, 10–present): He is arrested by the team while deep undercover. He is friends with Michelle Hanna and later joins Kensi Blye's Afghanistan team. Kensi initially believes him to be her suspect, but she later realizes he is a skilled operative and will be of great use to her. In season 8, it is revealed that Sabatino is working as part of a rogue CIA faction attempting to dismantle the NCIS team.
 Anslem Richardson as Tahir Khaled, a local warlord in Sudan (seasons 3, 7–8): A war criminal and warlord, he came into conflict with CIA agents and later NCIS agents Sam Hanna and G. Callen when they went to collect evidence about the genocide he was involved in. He is Sam's arch-enemy and began plotting revenge when Sam took his sister, Jada, from him. He is the primary antagonist of the seventh and eighth seasons, and later murders Sam's wife, Michelle, near the end of season eight. He eventually kills himself via bomb in a last (failed) attempt to kill Sam.
 Matthew Del Negro as Jack Simon (seasons 5, 7): Kensi's ex-fiancé, who was suspected of being a war-criminal known as 'The White Ghost'. Kensi was assigned to assassinate him in the series' fifth season.
Elizabeth Bogush as CIA Officer Joelle Taylor (seasons 5-present): Callen's ex-girlfriend, she is introduced as a teacher at a private school before it is revealed that she is part of the rogue CIA group tasked with dismantling the Office of Special Projects. In season 9, she, with the help of Callen, Sam, and Nell, fakes her death in order to take down the group behind the rogue CIA group. The group is known as the syndicate.
 Bar Paly as Anastasia "Anna" Kolcheck, a freelance NCIS Special Agent (seasons 6–present): The estranged daughter of Arkady Kolcheck, she is a prospective ATF agent who begins filling in on NCIS missions while Kensi is on medical leave. Following Kensi's return, Anna embarks on a relationship with Callen and joins NCIS as a Special Agent on a freelance basis. She and Callen are now engaged.
 John M. Jackson as A. J. Chegwidden, a retired Rear Admiral and the former Judge Advocate General of the Navy (seasons 8–9): A wartime confidant of both Hetty and Granger, Chegwidden served in Vietnam as a Navy Seal. He reenters the NCIS fold at Lange's behest during an investigation into the CIA. Jackson previously appeared as Chegwidden in nine seasons of JAG, and in one episode of NCIS.
 Andrea Bordeaux as Harley Hidoko, NCIS Special Agent (season 9): Executive Assistant to EADPAC Mosley. She starts off as fiercely loyal to her boss, but soon forms a friendship with the rest of the OSP team. At the end of the ninth season, Hidoko goes missing during an off-the-books mission in Mexico to rescue Mosley's son, and is revealed to have been captured and murdered by a cartel allied with Mosley's criminal ex-husband. Her remains are identified at the end of the tenth season premiere.
 Jeff Kober as Harris Keane (seasons 9–10, 13): A soldier who served in the CIA contingent led by Hetty and Granger in the Vietnam War. Keane was captured by Viet Cong and held captive for decades until he was rescued along with Hetty by the NCIS LA team.
 Ashley Spillers as Sydney Jones (seasons 9–10): A specialist for Homeland Security.
 Zeeko Zaki as Aimon Shah (Season 9, 3 episodes)
 Esai Morales as Louis Ochoa, NCIS Deputy Director (season 10): Ochoa temporarily takes over directing the team in Hetty's absence.
 Peter Jacobson as Special Prosecutor John Rogers (seasons 10–11): Rogers arrives at the Los Angeles office to investigate the team, but soon gets pulled into helping them out on their operations.
 David James Elliott as Harmon Rabb Jr. (seasons 10–11), a Naval Captain transferred from the Judge Advocate General to the USS Allegiance. Elliot reprised his role from JAG.
 Catherine Bell as Sarah MacKenzie (seasons 10–11), the former commander of Joint Legal Services Southwest who now acts as the Marine Corps liaison to the U.S. Secretary of State. Bell reprised her role from JAG.

Crossover 
 Scott Caan as Detective Sergeant Danny "Danno" Williams, HPD. He is a divorced single father who transferred from Newark PD in New Jersey to be with his daughter and is the de facto second-in-command of Five-0.
 Daniel Dae Kim as Detective Lieutenant Chin Ho Kelly, HPD. A veteran HPD detective, he was John McGarrett's former rookie and provides technical expertise and  local know-how.

Other 
 Louise Lombard as Lara Macy; a former Military Police Lieutenant and the Supervisory Special Agent of OSP, Macy was relieved of her position sometime between the pilot episode and the beginning of season one. Hetty remarks she was sent to Djibouti in retaliation for insubordination regarding budget, although the truthfulness of this is unknown. After a short time working with an NCIS satellite division, Macy is found dead in an NCIS episode, murdered as part of a vendetta against Washington Special Agent Leroy Jethro Gibbs. Lombard was not picked up as a regular in the new series and the character was killed in the NCIS episode "Patriot Down".

Episodes

Crossovers

Production 

In November 2008, it was reported that a first NCIS spin-off series set in Los Angeles would be introduced with a two-part backdoor pilot during the sixth season of NCIS. Special Agent G. Callen was initially a CIA operative created by Shane Brennan for a series that was never produced. After taking over show runner duties previously held by Donald P. Bellisario on NCIS, he used the potential of a spin-off to bring his story to fruition.

Brennan intended for the series to hold a Miami Vice-esque vibe through its two co-leads, Callen and Agent Sam Hanna. However, the character of Lara Macy was written to serve as a parallel for Gibbs, the lead of the original NCIS team. Macy was portrayed by Louise Lombard in the backdoor pilot, but she was not featured in the actual spin-off, and Brennan was able to produce the show as he originally envisioned it.

The show was known as NCIS: Legend while in production (referring to the episodes of NCIS in which the spin-off was introduced), and other names considered included OSP: Office of Special Projects, NCIS: OSP and NCIS: Undercover. Filming started in February 2009, with the characters being introduced in the two-part NCIS episode titled "Legend", the first part of which aired on April 28, 2009. This episode served as a backdoor pilot for the series, in a manner similar to the way NCIS was introduced by way of a two-part episode of JAG.

In May 2009, CBS picked up the series.

Broadcast 
In Asia, the series airs on AXN, AXN, and TVOne Pakistan. In the UK the series premieres its latest season first on Sky 1, with subsequent runs and repeats then also broadcast on Channel Five. In the Netherlands the series airs on NET5 .NCIS: Los Angeles airs on Network Ten, ONE and TVH!TS (formerly TV1) As of December 2019, it airs on Fox Crime after TV H!TS was rebranded as Fox One in Australia. In Israel it airs on Hot zone and yes HBO
In Portugal the series airs on Fox. It was next broadcast on M6 in France, 13th Street in Denmark and Germany, and Universal Channel in Italy.

Home media 

The first nine seasons have been released on DVD in Regions 1, 2 and 4, and Season 1 was released on Blu-ray Disc in Region A. The first season DVD release includes the two-part pilot episode that aired as part of the sixth season of NCIS, which were also included on the Season 6 DVD of NCIS. All releases are distributed by Paramount Home Entertainment.

Reception

Critical reception 
"Identity", the series' first episode, garnered 18.73 million viewers with a 4.4/11 share in the 18- to 49-year-old demographic and therefore won its timeslot. It was the second-most-watched show of the week, behind only the original NCIS.

Reviews for the show have been mixed. It has a score of 59/100 on Metacritic. According to Mary McNamara of the Los Angeles Times, "The crime is intriguing and multifaceted, its resolution requiring a nice balance of street smarts and lots of gunfire. But as with the original 'NCIS', the emphasis is on the characters of the team... Los Angeles, meanwhile, looks fabulous, a pleasing mixture of noir and gridlock, and there's an air of stability that's comforting in these uncertain times." The New York Daily News reviewer, David Hinckley, was more critical of the show saying that although "It all adds up to an hour of decent entertainment, and there's room for enough character development to give 'NCIS: Los Angeles' a personality of its own, ... a premiere episode shouldn't feel even a little like something we've already seen."

Tom Shales of The Washington Post felt that, "NCIS: Los Angeles gets the job done ... It's a procedural that follows strictly the established procedure, but it has likable characters, dislikable bad guys and the occasional flabbergasting shot of L.A." Robert Bianco of USA Today summarized it as a "serviceable hour that takes the NCIS formula—a light tone and a lot of banter wrapped around a fairly rudimentary investigatory plot—and transfers it to a special, undercover NCIS division in Los Angeles. Nothing more, but also nothing less." The Hollywood Reporter compared the show to The A-Team with "the same lighthearted approach to life-or-death situations. Maybe the biggest change is that 'NCIS: L.A.' achieves its inevitably favorable outcomes with a little more intellect and a little less testosterone." IGN stated that although "NCIS: Los Angeles doesn't exactly reinvent the police procedural... it's another above-average entry, aided by the fact that the people behind the show know what they're doing" and ultimately gave the episode a 7.7/10.

Ratings 
Seasonal rankings (based on average total viewers per episode) of NCIS: Los Angeles on CBS.

 Note: Each U.S. network television season starts in late September and ends in late May, which coincides with the completion of the May sweeps.

Awards and nominations

Potential spin-off 
On November 5, 2012, Deadline Hollywood reported the first news about a spin-off of NCIS: Los Angeles titled NCIS: Red. The new characters were introduced during a two-part episode of NCIS: Los Angeles. The spin-off was to feature a team of mobile agents, who travel around the country to solve crimes. This would have been the second successive spin-off in the NCIS franchise. However, on May 15, 2013, CBS confirmed that NCIS: Red was officially passed on and would not be moving forward. Scott Grimes reprised his potential spin-off role as NCIS: Red Agent Dave Flynn during the eighth season of NCIS: Los Angeles.

Adaptations 
In August 2016, Titan Books published NCIS Los Angeles: Extremis, a novel by Jerome Preisler. Three months later, it was followed by NCIS Los Angeles: Bolthole, written by Jeff Mariotte. Both books contain original stories featuring the characters from the show.

Notes

References

External links 

 
 

 
2009 American television series debuts
2000s American crime drama television series
2000s American police procedural television series
2010s American crime drama television series
2010s American police procedural television series
2020s American crime drama television series
2020s American police procedural television series
American action television series
CBS original programming
English-language television shows
Fictional portrayals of the Los Angeles Police Department
American military television series
Television series by CBS Studios
Television shows set in Los Angeles
 Television shows set in California
American television spin-offs
Television shows about the United States Marine Corps
Television shows adapted into comics
Television shows featuring audio description
Works about Mexican drug cartels